Wolfgang Haas (born 7 August 1948) is a Liechtenstein-born prelate of the Catholic Church who has been the first archbishop of the Archdiocese of Vaduz in Liechtenstein since 1998. He was Bishop of Chur in Switzerland from 1990 to 1997, after two years there as coadjutor.

Early years
Haas was born in Vaduz on 7 August 1948. He was ordained a priest and incardinated in Chur, Switzerland, on 7 April 1974. By 1988 he was chancellor of the diocese.

Bishop of Chur
Pope John Paul II appointed him coadjutor bishop of Chur–a diocese that covers several Swiss cantons and includes Zurich–on 25 March 1988, disregarding the candidates recommended by the senior clergy of Chur who traditionally propose candidates for the pope's approval. The Vatican had deemed those candidates unacceptable on political and theological grounds. Many Catholics in Chur rejected Haas for his conservative positions and what they considered his irregular appointment.

Haas received his episcopal consecration on 22 May 1988 from the bishop of Chur, Johannes Vonderach. The invitation-only ceremony was held in the cathedral but not open to the public. Invitees had to step over demonstrators, organized by theology students and priests, who lay on the ground in front of the entrance. The bishop of Basel Otto Wüst and 11 of the cathedral's 24 canons and a variety of other church officials did not attend. Haas succeeded as bishop when Pope John Paul accepted Vonderach's resignation on 22 May 1990. A group of about 7,000 Catholics attempted to deny Haas entry into the cathedral when he took possession of the see on 17 June 1990, and he entered by a back entrance. These tensions were never resolved, and Haas never succeeded in reconciling the diocese to his appointment. At times some cantons, including Grisons and Zurich, withheld their financial contributions from the diocese.

In 1991, he made a series of controversial decisions regarding the local theological college, St Luzi Seminary, wanting only candidates for the priesthood to study there. He replaced the rector and dismissed all students who were not in formation for the priesthood. In response the Synodal Council of the Roman Catholic corporation of the Canton of Zurich cut its funding to the diocese.

In March 1995, the president of the Synodal Council Eugen Baumgartner said: "We have been waiting for a long time for the removal of Wolfgang Haas. I simply cannot understand it any more and ask myself how long must we wait for a decision from Rome. If ever there were a bishop who could not unite his diocese, it is Wolfgang Haas."

Late in his tenure in Chur, Haas appointed three vicars general for the diocese over the objections of the 14 deans of the diocese, puzzling the Vatican by sidelining his auxiliary bishops.

Archbishop of Vaduz
On 2 December 1997, Pope John Paul erected the Archdiocese of Vaduz in Liechtenstein covering territory formerly part of the diocese of Chur, and named Haas its first archbishop. The archdiocese is not part of any national bishops conference and has no suffragan sees. When erected, Vaduz was among the smallest archdioceses in the world, with just 12 parishes and 23 priests. Reportedly Prince Hans-Adam II of Liechtenstein, a member of Opus Dei who shares Haas' views, negotiated the creation of an archdiocese in his country as a resolution to the problems Haas was having in Chur. Others credit the mediation of the Apostolic Nuncio to Switzerland and Liechtenstein Archbishop Karl-Josef Rauber. Haas took possession of the see on 21 December. The choir refused to participate and the sacristan provided no flowers. Strict security protocols were enforced as a thousand protesters staged a funeral procession.

Beginning in 2011, because the government of Liechtenstein began considering legislation to end the Catholic Church's official status, to liberalize abortion, and to protect the civil liberties of gays and lesbians, Haas refused to celebrate the traditional outdoor mass on Liechtenstein's national day.

In Vaduz, Haas has demonstrated strong support for the Priestly Fraternity of St. Peter, frequently ordaining its members. As a result, tensions continue between Haas and non-traditionalist Catholics in Liechtenstein.

He installed a gold episcopal throne in the cathedral at his own expense, and later, at a cost to the archdiocese of 130,000 Swiss francs, three vaults for episcopal tombs in the nave, which proved controversial.

In October 2021, Haas announced that Vaduz would not participate in the worldwide program of synods by holding one of its own. He called the process complex and said it might prove ideological. He said communication in the archdiocese was easy and available, and that his listening as a bishop did not require long debates. A local theologian and critic of Haas called this characterization "a pure lie". A local organization of Catholics initiated its own synod instead.

In June 2022, Haas refused to participate in the annual confirmation mass and dinner with local officials in Schaan, because the town was hosting Lichtenstein's first gay pride march the day before.

There has even been speculation that with Haas due to tender his resignation in 2023 the archdiocese might disappear, given that it was created for him and is extremely small, isolated from national bishops organizations.

Notes

References

20th-century Roman Catholic archbishops in Liechtenstein
21st-century Roman Catholic archbishops in Liechtenstein
1948 births
Living people
People from Vaduz
Bishops of Chur